Victoria gordoni is a species of moth in the family Geometridae first described by Louis Beethoven Prout in 1912. It is known from Angola, Ivory Coast, Nigeria, Cameroon and Kenya.

References

 Prout, L. B. (1912). "Lepidoptera Heterocera, fam. Geometridae, subfamily Hemitheinae". In: Wytsman, Genera Insectorum. 129. 129: 1–274; pls. 1–5.

Geometrinae
Moths of Africa
Moths described in 1912
Taxa named by Louis Beethoven Prout